The Ryan XF2R Dark Shark was an American experimental aircraft built for the United States Navy that combined turboprop and turbojet propulsion. It was based on Ryan Aeronautical's earlier FR Fireball, but replaced the Fireball's piston engine with a turboprop engine.

Design and development

The XF2R Dark Shark was based on Ryan Aeronautical's earlier FR Fireball, but replaced the Fireball's piston engine with a General Electric T31 turboprop engine driving a 4-bladed Hamilton Standard propeller. The turboprop made for much improved performance over the Fireball, but the Navy showed little interest in it; by that time, they had abandoned the idea of the combination fighter and were instead looking into all-jet fighters.

The United States Air Force, however, showed a little more interest; they were at the time evaluating the Convair XP-81 of similar concept, and asked Ryan to modify the XF2R to use the Westinghouse J34 turbojet instead of the General Electric J31 used previously. Modifications to the prototype created the XF2R-2, with the jet intakes moved to the sides of the forward fuselage with NACA ducts instead of the inlets in the wing leading edge used before.

Although the Dark Shark proved to be a capable aircraft, it never progressed beyond the prototype stage; all-jet aircraft were considered superior.

Specifications (XF2R-1)

See also

References

Notes

Bibliography

 Ginter, Steve. Ryan FR-1 Fireball and XF2R-1 Darkshark, Naval Fighters Number 28'''. Simi Valley, CA: Ginter Books, 1995. .
 McDowell, Ernest. FR-1 Fireball, Mini in action number 5''. Carrollton, TX: Squadron/Signal Publications Inc., 1995. .

External links

  "Navy Tests Its Hotter Fireball" , March 1947, Popular Science'' article mid-page 84

Mixed-power aircraft
Ryan FR2 Dark Shark
Ryan aircraft
Carrier-based aircraft
Aircraft first flown in 1946